The 12th Annual Nickelodeon Kids' Choice Awards was held on May 1, 1999, at Pauley Pavilion at UCLA in Los Angeles, California. Actress Rosie O'Donnell hosted the ceremony for the fourth time. 3rd Storee, Britney Spears, TLC, and NSYNC performed live from Orlando, Florida. About 6.2 million children participated in voting. The ceremony is also notable as leading into "Help Wanted/Reef Blower/Tea at the Treedome", the pilot episode and first airing of the now-long running animated series SpongeBob SquarePants.

Winners and nominees
Winners are listed first, in bold. Other nominees are in alphabetical order.

Movies

Television

Music

Sports

Miscellaneous

Hall of Fame
 Jonathan Taylor Thomas

External links

References

Nickelodeon Kids' Choice Awards
Kids' Choice Awards
Kids' Choice Awards
Kids' Choice Awards
20th century in Los Angeles